On 16 March 2017, an airstrike by the United States Armed Forces killed up to 49 people in the rebel-held village of al-Jinah near Aleppo, Syria. The US military claimed the people targeted in the strike were militants belonging to the terrorist group al-Qaeda. However, the Syrian Observatory for Human Rights (SOHR), local residents and local officials have claimed that the building struck was a mosque filled with worshipers. At the time, US military claimed that the structure bombed was not a mosque itself but was next to a mosque, which was undamaged. However, on May 5, 2017, a US Central Command investigation determined that the building was indeed part of a mosque-complex. Rami Abdel Rahman, head of SOHR, claimed the structure was a mosque which held over 300 people at the time of the strike.  In September 2017, the United Nations Commission of Inquiry on Syria concluded that "United States forces failed to take all feasible precautions to avoid or minimize incidental loss of civilian life, injury to civilians and damage to civilian objects, in violation of international humanitarian law." The UN commission's findings did not support the U.S. claim that an al-Qaeda meeting was taking place.

Casualties
Forty-two people were initially reported by the SOHR to have been killed, though the group said that by March 17 the death toll had increased to 49, while The Guardian reported that 46 people had died. The SOHR said that most of the casualties were civilians, and more than 100 people were injured. The Syrian Civil Defence said that "dozens" of people had been buried in rubble following the strike. According to a September 2017 report from the UN Commission of Inquiry on Syria, 38 people were killed, including one woman and five children, and 26 people were wounded.

According to a spokesman for the Pentagon, "dozens" of al-Qaeda fighters, including "senior al Qaeda terrorists, some of these were likely high value individuals", were among those killed.  Another spokesman stated that initial assessments indicated no civilian casualties.

U.S. involvement
A missile fragment was reportedly found at the attack scene which had Latin alphabet letters corresponding with script found on missiles used by US forces, according to British investigative group Bellingcat. The Syrian Institute for Justice released photographs showing fragments of American weapons at the site of the bombing, which British newspaper The Telegraph cited as evidence that the US was responsible for civilian casualties.

A United States Central Command spokesman, Josh Jacques, confirmed that the United States had carried out an airstrike, but said that the area was "assessed to be a meeting place for al-Qaeda, and we took the strike," and denied both that the mosque had been the target and that it had been the building that was destroyed. Pentagon spokesman Jeff Davis later clarified that the target had been identified as a "partially constructed community center." The photo released by the Pentagon showed the mosque was "relatively unscathed," Davis added.

The Washington Post reported that two Reaper drones fired at least four Hellfire missiles and dropped a  bomb in the attack. Within a week of the attack, US Central Command began two internal investigations, one into whether civilians had been killed and another to find additional information about the type of building hit and its occupants. On May 5, 2017, the investigation determined that the building was indeed part of a mosque-complex.

According to Forensic Architecture, witness testimonies and photographs of the building taken before the strike suggested few of the rooms had doors separating them from one another. A large number of local residents visited regularly and the building was open to the public. Forensic Architecture concluded that "[a]ll of this makes it unlikely that a meeting of senior al-Qaeda operatives would have been taking place at the time of the strike."

In a report released 18 April 2017, Human Right Watch stated that they had "not found evidence to support the allegation that members of al-Qaeda or any other armed group were meeting in the mosque." Local residents in the area reported that there were no members of armed groups at the mosque or in the area at the time of the attack and that the victims were all civilians and local residents. First responders to the initial strike said the dead and injured wore civilian clothes and that they saw no weapons at the site. Human Rights Watch also noted that "U.S. authorities have so far released no information to support their claims."

In June 2017, a United States military investigation found the airstrike was legal and caused one civilian casualty. U.S. Army Brig. Gen. Paul Bontrager said the investigation into the attack did not involve any interviews with people on the ground and no U.S. personnel visited the site.

In September 2017, a report from the UN Commission of Inquiry on Syria said that three days before striking the mosque compound, the U.S. team knew about the target but did not do enough to verify it. The Commission therefore concluded that "United States forces failed to take all feasible precautions to avoid or minimize incidental loss of civilian life, injury to civilians and damage to civilian objects, in violation of international humanitarian law." The UN commission said its findings did not support the U.S. claim that an al-Qaeda meeting was taking place there and the U.S. had not released evidence that such a meeting took place. The report noted that the United States Central Command investigation included interviews with dozens of people, none of whom were in al-Jinah at the time of the attack. The investigators said the U.S. had sought to limit collateral damage using ten bombs that produced minimal blast and fragmentation to hit the building, before following up with two missiles fired by a drone at people fleeing.

Reactions
 Russia – Defense Minister Sergey Shoygu urged a comment from the United States after photos of a reported US missile fragment found at the site of the bombed Syrian mosque appeared on the Internet.

See also
 Civilian casualties from U.S. drone strikes
 2019 U.S. airstrike in Baghuz
 2017 Mosul airstrike
 Kunduz hospital airstrike

Notes

References

Airstrikes during the Syrian civil war
American airstrikes during the Syrian civil war
March 2017 events in Syria
Mass murder in 2017
Military operations of the Syrian civil war involving Tahrir al-Sham
Military operations of the Syrian civil war involving the United States
Military operations of the Syrian civil war in 2017
Presidency of Donald Trump